Evangelische Humiliatenorden (the Evangelical Order of Humiliati) is a German High Church Lutheran religious order, founded in 1921.

The foundation of the Humiliatenorden was inspired by Friedrich Heiler. It is similar to a third order with temporal vows. The order is Lutheran in its accentuation of sola gratia, while it is Catholic in its position on the
sacrament and the church. In 1946, under the direction of Abbot Richard Walter, the Order was "placed completely in the services of the Una Sancta idea", working for Lutheran - Roman Catholic ecumenism.

References

 PROTESTANT COMMUNITIES AND ORDERS Broken Link

History of Lutheranism in Germany
Lutheran orders and societies
Christian organizations established in 1921
1921 establishments in Germany
Protestant third orders